Male Češnjice (in older sources also Male Črešnjice) is a small settlement just north of Šentvid pri Stični in the Municipality of Ivančna Gorica in central Slovenia. The area is part of the historical region of Lower Carniola. The municipality is now included in the Central Slovenia Statistical Region.

References

External links
Male Češnjice on Geopedia

Populated places in the Municipality of Ivančna Gorica